Bride of Christ is a metaphor for the church in Christian theology.

Bride of Christ or Brides of Christ may also refer to:

 A nun or a consecrated virgin, a woman who has made a special religious vow in public
 Bride of Christ Church, a Christian sect started in the early 1900s in Corvallis, Oregon by Edmund Creffield
 Brides of Christ, a 1991 Australian TV miniseries

Music
 "Bride of Christ", a song by Faith from Sorg
 "Bride of Christ", a song by Astral Doors from Evil is Forever